Large-tooth flounders or sand flounders are a family, Paralichthyidae, of flounders. The family contains 14 genera with a total of about 110 species. They lie on the sea bed on their right side; both eyes are always on the left side of the head, while the Pleuronectidae usually (but not always) have their eyes on the right side of the head.

They are found in temperate and tropical waters of the Atlantic, Indian and Pacific Oceans.

Several species are important commercial and game fishes, notably the California halibut, Paralichthys californicus and the Pacific sanddab, Citharichthys sordidus.

Phylogenetic analyses have long indicated the non-monophyly of this family e.g., and two lineages have been consistently apparent. Termed groups, the two groups were named after genera: a Cyclopsetta group and a Pseudorhombus group (see summary in ). A formal description of Cycopsettidae in 2019 created this family consisting of four genera: Cyclopsetta, Etropus, Citharichthys, and Syacium corresponding to the previously recognized Cyclopsetta group. Molecular phylogenetic evidence indicates that Paralichthyidae in this sense is sister to Pleuronectidae and Cyclopsettidae is sister to Bothidae e.g.

References 

 
Taxa named by Paul Chabanaud
Marine fish families